Half Nelson is a compilation album of duets performed by country singer Willie Nelson along with various other artists, released in 1985. It also includes a few never-before released hits as well.

Track listing

Personnel 
Willie Nelson – Guitar, vocals
Ray Charles – Piano, vocals
Carlos Santana – Guitar
Julio Iglesias – Vocals
Lacy J. Dalton – Guitar, vocals
Merle Haggard – Guitar, vocals
George Jones – Guitar, vocals
Mel Tillis – Guitar, vocals
Hank Williams – Guitar, vocals
Neil Young – Guitar, Harmonica, Vocals
Leon Russell – Piano, vocals

Charts

Weekly charts

Year-end charts

References

1985 compilation albums
Willie Nelson compilation albums
Vocal duet albums
Columbia Records compilation albums